Isotoma anethifolia is a small herbaceous plant in the family Campanulaceae and is endemic to eastern Australia. It has single, mostly white flowers in the leaf axils and slender stems.

Description
The star-shaped flowers are mostly white with a light shading of mauve or pink and single in leaf axils. Flowering occurs in spring and summer.

Taxonomy and naming
This species was first formally described in 1932 by Victor Samuel Summerhayes and the description was published in the Bulletin of Miscellaneous Information, (Royal Botanic Gardens, Kew). The specific epithet (anethifolia) is derived from the Latin anethum- meaning "anise" and -folius meaning "leaved".

Distribution and habitat

References

anethifolia
Flora of Queensland
Flora of New South Wales
Plants described in 1932